Lelov is a Polish-Israeli Hasidic dynastic court, which traces its origins to the town of Lelów, Poland where the court was established in 1815 by Rabbi Dovid Biderman (1746-1814).

The Lelover dynasty migrated from Poland to Jerusalem when Biderman's son, Rabbi Moshe Biderman (1776-1851), the son-in-law of Rabbi Yaakov Yitzchak Rabinowicz, moved there in the last year of his life. In the 21st century several descendants of the dynasty are Lelover rebbes, in Bnei Brak, Jerusalem, Beit Shemesh and Brooklyn.

History
Dovid Biderman of Lelov was a disciple of the Yaakov Yitzchak, known as the Seer of Lublin.

The early Lelover rebbes (starting with Dovid Tzvi Shlomo) were followers of the Karlin (Hasidic dynasty).

Outline of Lelover dynasty
Grand Rabbi Dovid of Lelov (1746-1814)
Grand Rabbi Moshe Biderman of Lelov (1776-1851)
Grand Rabbi Eleazar Mendel Biderman of Lelov (1827-1882)
Grand Rabbi Dovid Tzvi Shlomo Biderman of Lelov (1844-1918)
Grand Rabbi Shimon Noson Nuta Biderman of Lelov (1870-1929)
Grand Rabbi Pinchos Chaim Biderman of Lelov
Grand Rabbi Moshe Mordechai Biderman of Lelov and Karlin (1903-1987).
Grand Rabbi Shimon Noson Nuta Biderman of Lelov (1931 - 2009). 
Grand Rabbi Avrohom Shlomo Biderman of Lelov-Jerusalem (Zephania Street) (1927-2000).
Grand Rabbi Alter Elozor Menachem Biderman of Lelov in Bnei Brak (1935-2001).
Grand Rabbi Aaron Biderman of Lelov (current)

See also
History of the Jews in Poland
Boston (Hasidic dynasty)

References 

A Chassidic journey : the Polish Chassidic dynasties of Lublin, Lelov, Nikolsburg and Boston. Based on Shalsheles Boston by Meir Valach, translated by Eliezer Shore. New York : Feldheim, 2002 

Hasidic dynasties headquartered in Jerusalem
Jewish Polish history
Orthodox Judaism in Poland